The Theban Tomb TT32 is located in El-Khokha, part of the Theban Necropolis, on the west bank of the Nile, opposite to Luxor. It is the burial place of the ancient Egyptian official, Djehutymose.

Djehutymose (or Tuthmose) was a chief steward of Amun and overseer of the granaries of Upper and Lower Egypt during the reign of Ramesses II (19th Dynasty). His wife Esi (Isis) is shown in the hall and the passage of the tomb.

It was later used by the Roman Soter family for burials in the first and second centuries CE.

In 2018, an excavation of the tomb by the University of Strasbourg resulted in the discoveries of two perfectly preserved coffins, each with a perfectly preserved mummy, one of which is a woman named Thuya. A thousand funerary statues were also discovered at the site.

See also
 List of Theban tombs

References

Buildings and structures completed in the 13th century BC
Theban tombs